Tell el-Fukhar is a multi-period site spanning the early Bronze Age to the Roman Period.  The name "Tell el-Fukhar" is Arabic for "mound of potsherds," a testament to the history of looting at the site.

History

Tell el-Fukhar was settled during the Early Bronze Age II and III.  Tell el-Fukhar is a multi-period site with archaeological evidence showing occupation during the Early Bronze Age, Late Bronze Age/Early Iron Age, Persian Empire and Hellenistic Period.  Additionally, there is evidence of Roman period looting and squatting at the site.

Archaeological remains found at el-Fukhar include a Late Bronze Age II cooking pot which, analysis shows, came from the Region of Gaza.  This is evidence of extensive trade networks between Tell el-Fukhar and other regional trade centers.

Site

Numerous houses have been investigated, as well as the discovery of a monumental public building built between 1450BC and 1300BC, during the LB IB-IIB period, which was destroyed during a period of wide-scale destruction at the end of the period.  "Late Bronze/early Iron Age fortifications, domestic and probable palatial installations, and a single Philistine krater rim sherd" have also been found.

Historic, unassociated finds are also located in the area, included humain remains originating from "a fight between bedawins and townsmen in 1931."

Looting is occurring and has occurred at the site historically.  Activities associated with looting artifacts from the Iron Age to the Hellenistic Period have been archaeologically documented through the preservation of "numerous robber trenches, pits, and possibly fills which contained great numbers of ceramics".  The site continues to be at significant risk from modern looting.

Notes

Sources

Strange, J. 1997. "Tall al-Fukhar 1990-91 (sic): A Preliminary Report." Studies in the History and Archaeology of Jordan VI: 399-406.

External Links
Photos of Tall el Fukhar at the American Center of Research

Archaeological sites in Jordan